Denis Collins or Dennis Collins may refer to:

Denis Collins (business ethicist) (born 1956), American teacher of business ethics
Denis Collins (footballer) (1953–2011), Australian rules footballer of the 1970s
Denis Collins (journalist), American journalist and juror in the trial of Scooter Libby
Denis Collins (politician) (born 1941), Australian politician from the Northern Territory
Dennis J. Collins (1900–1974), American politician and lawyer
Dennis P. Collins (1924–2009), American politician; former mayor of Bayonne, New Jersey